This article contains lists of rural localities in Russia, organized by federal subject. The federal subjects of Russia are the constituent entities of Russia, its top-level political divisions according to the Constitution of Russia. Under the classification system for inhabited locations in Russia, a rural locality is one of a number of types of rural settlements, including villages, selos, stanitsas, slobodas, khutors, pochinoks, and other local variations.

List of localities

References

Lists of places in Russia